Maryland Route 481 (MD 481) is a state highway in the U.S. state of Maryland.  Known as Damsontown Road, the state highway runs  from MD 309 near Queen Anne north to MD 304 in Ruthsburg.  MD 481, which was constructed in the early 1930s, provides access to Tuckahoe State Park on its course through southeastern Queen Anne's County.

Route description

MD 481 begins at an intersection with MD 309 (Starr Road) north of Queen Anne.  The two-lane undivided state highway heads north through farmland, passing Crouse Mill Road, which is used to access Tuckahoe State Park from the west.  MD 481 curves east to cross Blockiston Branch, then veers north and meets the other end of Crouse Mill Road.  The state highway reaches its northern terminus at MD 304 (Ruthsburg Road) in Ruthsburg.

History
MD 481 was completed in 1933.  The state highway has not changed beyond minor improvements.

Junction list

See also

References

External links

MDRoads: MD 481

481
Maryland Route 481